Brady Glacier is a  long  glacier located in Glacier Bay National Park and Preserve in the U.S. state of Alaska. It was named by the U.S. Coast and Geodetic Survey for missionary and later governor Rev. Mr Brady O'Keefe.

When George Vancouver first set eyes on the Brady Glacier in 1794, it was a calving tidewater glacier that dumped ice into the Taylor Bay. The following century, the glacier advanced eight kilometers. This advance was taken by Bengston (1962) as a sign of the glacier changing from a tidal to non-tidal one. Bengston also stated that the huge outwash plain at the glacier's terminus allows it to preserve itself even as most glaciers in the region retreated. The Brady Glacier has an ELA (the line above which snow remains even after summer's end) of only 800 meters, one of the lowest in Alaska.

See also
 List of glaciers

References

Glaciers of Glacier Bay National Park and Preserve
Glaciers of Hoonah–Angoon Census Area, Alaska
Glaciers of Unorganized Borough, Alaska